Kim Yun-Mi (born 28 April 1981) is a North Korean international table tennis player.

She won a silver medal and bronze medal at the 2001 World Table Tennis Championships.

See also
 List of table tennis players

References

North Korean female table tennis players
Living people
1981 births
Table tennis players at the 2004 Summer Olympics
Olympic table tennis players of North Korea
Asian Games medalists in table tennis
Table tennis players at the 2002 Asian Games
Asian Games gold medalists for North Korea
Medalists at the 2002 Asian Games
World Table Tennis Championships medalists
21st-century North Korean women